The 2020 Boys' U18 Volleyball European Championship was the 14th edition of the Boys' Youth European Volleyball Championship, organised by Europe's governing volleyball body, the CEV. Originally, the tournament was scheduled to be hosted jointly by Italy and Greece, but the latter gave up the hosting right. The tournament was held in Lecce and Marsicovetere, Italy from 5 to 13 September 2020. The top six teams of the tournament qualified for the 2021 FIVB Volleyball Boys' U19 World Championship as the CEV representatives.

Players must be born on or after 1 January 2003.

Qualification

The second round qualification was canceled due to the COVID-19 pandemic and the remaining six spots were allocated according to the Men's U18 CEV European Ranking as of 1 June 2019. But, Finland, France, Russia and Slovakia withdrew just before the beginning of the tournament due to travel restrictions still in place in response to the COVID-19 pandemic.

Hosts

Qualified through the first round qualification

Top six ranked teams from the Men's U18 CEV European Ranking as of 1 June 2019 which had not yet qualified

Pools composition
Hosts Italy and Czech Republic, the top team from the Men's U18 CEV European Ranking as of 1 June 2019, were directly placed as head of pool I and II respectively. All teams not seeded were placed to five pots as based on their Men's U18 CEV European Ranking as of 1 June 2019 position and drawn accordingly into pool I and II. In case several teams shared the same position, the teams were seeded as per the final standing of the 2018 Boys' U18 European Championship. The draw was held in Luxembourg City, Luxembourg on 14 August 2020. But, Finland, France, Russia and Slovakia withdrew after the draw. Rankings are shown in brackets except the hosts who ranked 2nd.

Draw

Squads

Venues
 Sport Hall Villa D’Agri, Marsicovetere, Italy – Pool I and 5th–8th places
 Lecce Sport Hall, Lecce, Italy – Pool II and Final four

Pool standing procedure
 Number of matches won
 Match points
 Sets ratio
 Points ratio
 If the tie continues as per the point ratio between two teams, the priority will be given to the team which won the match between them. When the tie in points ratio is between three or more teams, a new classification of these teams in the terms of points 1, 2, 3 and 4 will be made taking into consideration only the matches in which they were opposed to each other.

Match won 3–0 or 3–1: 3 match points for the winner, 0 match points for the loser
Match won 3–2: 2 match points for the winner, 1 match point for the loser

Preliminary round
All times are Central European Summer Time (UTC+02:00).

Pool I

|}

|}

Pool II

|}

|}

Final round
All times are Central European Summer Time (UTC+02:00).

5th–8th places

5th–8th semifinals

|}

7th place match

|}

5th place match

|}

Final four

Semifinals

|}

3rd place match

|}

Final

|}

Final standing

Awards

Most Valuable Player
 Luca Porro
Best Setter
 Šimon Bryknar
Best Outside Spikers
 Luca Porro
 Kamil Szymendera

Best Middle Blockers
 Jakub Klajmon
 Mateusz Nowak
Best Opposite Spiker
 Georgi Tatarov
Best Libero
 Gabriele Laurenzano

See also
2020 Girls' U17 Volleyball European Championship

References

External links
Official website

Boys' Youth European Volleyball Championship
European Boys' Youth Championship
Volleyball
Volleyball
International men's volleyball competitions hosted by Italy
Volleyball European Championship (boys)